Cyclophora subpallida is a moth of the  family Geometridae. It is found in South America and Central America and on the Antilles.

References

Moths described in 1900
Cyclophora (moth)
Moths of North America
Moths of South America